Events from the year 1995 in Portuguese Macau.

Incumbents
 Governor - Vasco Joaquim Rocha Vieira

Events

November
 9 November - The opening of Macau International Airport in Taipa.

December
 25 December - The inauguration of Macau Wine Museum in Sé.

References

 
Years of the 20th century in Macau
Macau
Macau
1990s in Macau